KIAD may refer to:

 Washington Dulles International Airport, a major airport in Northern Virginia near Washington, D.C., United States
 Kent Institute of Art & Design
 KIAD (FM), a radio station (88.5 FM) licensed to Dubuque, Iowa, United States